Central Arkansas Telephone Cooperative (CATC) is a non-profit rural telephone utility cooperative serving the cities of Bismarck and Donaldson and the surrounding rural areas of Hot Spring County, Arkansas.

CATC was formed in 1951 after repeated efforts to lure the larger telephone companies into serving the area failed.

The original office was located and still exists in Donaldson.  However, area growth led to the opening of CATC's second office in Bismarck.

CATC is one of only two telephone cooperatives still operating in the state of Arkansas.  , CATC serves over 3,400 customers.

External links
Central Arkansas Telephone Cooperative

Electric cooperatives in Arkansas
Telephone cooperatives in the United States
American companies established in 1951 
Telecommunications companies established in 1951 
1951 establishments in Arkansas